George Walton (1749–1804) was an American politician who signed the United States Declaration of Independence.

George Walton may also refer to:

 George Walton (1615–1686), proprietor of Walton's Tavern, scene of early American witchcraft, in New Castle, New Hampshire
 George Walton (Manitoba politician) (1854–1925), politician in Manitoba, Canada
 George Walton (Royal Navy officer) (1664/5–1739), British Royal Navy admiral
 George Henry Walton (1867–1933), Scottish architect and designer
 George L. Walton (1850–1941), American politician in Louisiana
 George Walton (MP), Member of Parliament (MP) for Huntingdonshire
 George Walton (cricketer) (1863–1921), English cricketer
 George Walton (footballer) (born 1911), English footballer